Eqtesad-e Golestan (اقتصاد گلستان lit. "Golestan Economics") is an independent socio-economic Persian language weekly paper published in Gorgan, Golestan, Iran. The first issue appeared on the newsstands throughout Golestan province and especially in the capital, Gorgan city, on 18 February 2005.

This is the fourteenth regular newspaper or magazine to be published in the province since 1996.

Moosa Jorjani, a Sunni Muslim of the Iranian Turkomen ethnic minority origin, is its license holder and official director, and Abdonnasser Mohaimeni, an Iranian Shii Muslim of Persian origin is its editor-in-chief and executive manager. At 22,500 copies for each issue, the newspaper has the largest circulation recorded in the history of local newspapers in North Iran.

Eqtesad-e Golestan is usually published in eight (and sometimes twelve) pages, with the first and last pages being in full color. The size of each page is 35 cm by 50 cm.

At present, the newspaper is in no way a specialised one, but rather a general socio-cultural and economic weekly covering news, articles, commentaries and advertisements related to local, national and international matters.

2005 establishments in Iran
Newspapers published in Iran
Weekly newspapers
Newspapers established in 2005
Persian-language newspapers
Mass media in Gorgan